Det æ'kke te å tru is a 1942 Norwegian drama film directed by Toralf Sandø, starring Leif Juster and Ernst Diesen. Two executives at a retail company both try to come up with the best idea for the autumn fair, and win the big prize.

Cast
Leif Juster as Bernt
Ernst Diesen as Nils
Erling Drangsholt as Aalberg
Thorleif Reiss as Harald Hagen
Eva Lunde as Unni Borg
Tryggve Larssen as Hansen - inventor
Guri Stormoen as Mrs Hansen
Anne-Lise Wang as Vera
Einar Vaage as Storm, director
Ulf Selmer as Abel, grocer
Erling Hanson as Wang, lawyer
Jens Bolling as Olaf Borg
Alfred Solaas as the Conference Speaker
Finn Bernhoft as Pedersen
Folkman Schaanning as the Barber Master
Rolf Christensen as Olsen, auditor
Sissel Thygesen as Ms Bull
Margit Brataas as Gina, a dancer

External links
 
 

1942 films
1942 drama films
Norwegian drama films
Norwegian black-and-white films
Films directed by Toralf Sandø
1940s Norwegian-language films